Daniel Leow Le Roux (25 November 1933 - August 2016) was a South African former footballer who played as a winger.

Pre-football career
He was born in Port Shepstone, KwaZulu-Natal. He was a bank clerk before he took up football.

Career
Le Roux played for Queen's Park in his native South Africa before signing for English First Division team Arsenal in February 1957. He made five Football League appearances in the 1957–58 season before returning to South Africa to play for Durban City.

Arsenal
He made his debut on 7 December 1957 in a 2-1 loss to Burnley where he played as an outside right. His teammate Jim Standen was also a debutant.

References

1933 births
2016 deaths
People from Port Shepstone
Afrikaner people
South African soccer players
South Africa international soccer players
South African expatriate soccer players
Association football wingers
South African expatriate sportspeople in England
Expatriate footballers in England
Arsenal F.C. players
English Football League players
Jewish Guild players
National Football League (South Africa) players